Dark Mirror is an original novel based on the U.S. television series Angel. Tagline: "What is the true reflection of a champion?" (The promotional image of the 'Book cover' above has the wrong tagline).

Plot summary
A series of perfect clones of members at Angel Investigations are lurking in the city, planning to kill the originals. Team Angel must find out where the replicas are coming from and why, before the murder spree hits the whole city. Thanks to Wesley's research, the gang realise that they are facing the 'Seven Sinners', dimension-jumping demons who travel to other worlds, steal the negative aspects of the souls of some of the greatest heroes of that world, and subsequently gain power by killing the originals and absorbing their souls into their power source. Once they have been copied, only the original can kill 'their' Sinner, with other attempts simply incapacitating the Sinners until they can regenerate. The Sinners have targeted Angel Investigations with the intention of duplicating Angel, as they feel that only Angelus would possess the necessary skills to lead them in their destruction of this world. However, the final seven clones- consisting of Angelus, Lorne, Wesley, Connor, Fred, Gunn, and Lilah- are all killed by their templates, Angel subsequently destroying their power source.

Continuity
Characters include: Angel, Cordelia, Wesley, Gunn, Fred, Lorne, Connor, and Lilah Morgan.
Supposed to be set in Angel season 4.
Cordelia has no memory of who she is, Fred and Gunn are still very much in love, and Connor and Wesley are still somewhat unwelcome at the Hyperion.
Fits best between the episodes "Slouching Toward Bethlehem" and "Supersymmetry" assuming that Cordelia stayed at the Hyperion rather than with Connor. 
At one point a Sinner attempts to copy Cordelia, but the attempt proves unsuccessful, most likely due to Cordelia currently being possessed by Jasmine- albeit in a state of amnesia- and hence her soul was not actually dominant at the time.

Canonical issues

Angel books such as this one are not usually considered by fans as canonical. Some fans consider them stories from the imaginations of authors and artists, while other fans consider them as taking place in an alternative fictional reality. However unlike fan fiction, overviews summarising their story, written early in the writing process, were 'approved' by both Fox and Joss Whedon (or his office), and the books were therefore later published as officially Buffy/Angel merchandise.

External links

Teen-books.com - Reviews of this book

Angel (1999 TV series) novels
2004 American novels
2004 fantasy novels